Wunderbar may refer to:

General
 Wunderbar, a German expression used in English which means "wonderful"
 Wunderbar (chocolate bar), a chocolate bar sold in Canada and Germany
 Wunderbar Films, an Indian film production company

Music
 "Wünderbar", a 1981 song by British punk band Tenpole Tudor
 "Wunderbar", a song from the Cole Porter musical Kiss Me, Kate
 "Wunderbar", a song released by German writer Christiane F. under the name "Sentimentale Jugend"
 "Wunderbar" (Concerto In Koch Minor), " , a bonus track on album Lil' Beethoven by the band Sparks
 Wunderbar (Patrizio Buanne album), 2012
 Wunderbar (The Living End album), 2018